Sarinee Phenglaor (born 26 June 1962) is a Thai athlete. She competed in the women's long jump at the 1984 Summer Olympics.

References

1962 births
Living people
Athletes (track and field) at the 1984 Summer Olympics
Sarinee Phenglaor
Sarinee Phenglaor
Place of birth missing (living people)